The 2008 Men's World Open Squash Championship is the men's edition of the World Open, which serves as the individual world championship for squash players. The event took place in the Manchester in England from 11 to 19 October 2008. Ramy Ashour won his first World Open title, defeating Karim Darwish in the final.

Ranking points
In 2008, the points breakdown were as follows:

Seeds

Draws and results

Finals

Top half

Section 1

Section 2

Bottom half

Section 1

Section 2

See also
 World Open
 2008 Women's World Open Squash Championship

References

External links
 World Squash 2008 Official Website 
 World Open 2008 at Squashsite

World Squash Championships
W
W
2008 in English sport
Squash tournaments in the United Kingdom
International sports competitions in Manchester
Squash in England